Dutch hostage crisis may refer to:
 1975 Dutch train hostage crisis
 1975 Indonesian consulate hostage crisis

See also 
 1977 Dutch hostage crisis (disambiguation)